Farooqabad , earlier known as Choorkana is a city in Sheikhupura District, Punjab, Pakistan. It is situated along the twin canals (Qadirabad Balloki Link Canal and Upper Gogera Branch Canal) about 55 km west of Lahore on Sargodha Road along Lahore-Islamabad M-2 Motorway and on Lahore-Faisalabad-Karachi Main Railway Line.

History 
Sheikhupura District, where Farooqabad is located, has been an agricultural region with dense forests ever since the Indus Valley civilization some five thousand years ago. The Vedic period is characterized by Indo-Aryan culture that invaded from Central Asia and settled in the Punjab region. The Kambojas, Daradas, Kaikayas, Madras, Pauravas, Yaudheyas, Malavas and Kurus invaded, settled and ruled this ancient Punjab region. After overrunning the Achaemenid Empire in 331 BCE, Alexander marched into the present-day Punjab region with an army of 50,000. Sheikhupura was ruled by the Maurya Empire, Indo-Greek kingdom, Kushan Empire, Gupta Empire, White Huns, Kushano-Hephthalites and the Turk and Hindu Shahi kingdoms and then the British in recent times.

In 1005 AD, Sultan Mahmud Ghaznavi conquered the Punjab region including this area. The Delhi Sultanate and later Mughal Empire ruled the region. The Punjab region became predominantly Muslim due to the influence of missionary Sufi saints whose dargahs dot the landscape of the Punjab region.

After the decline of the Mughal Empire, the Sikh Empire under Maharajah Ranjit Singh created a secular kingdom in the Punjab. The first police station, in Farooqabad, was set up during the British rule in 1924 and is called Sadar Thana Farooqabad. Steady growth followed as students came in from all parts of the Punjab and North West India. The predominantly Muslim population supported the Muslim League and the Pakistan Movement.  After the independence of Pakistan in 1947, the minority Hindus and Sikhs in the Farooqabad area migrated to India while the Muslim refugees from India settled in the Farooqabad region. In recent times, 'Sikh Yatrees' (Sikh visitors) regularly come to visit their sacred sites, like Sucha Sauda in the Farooqabad area, from all over the world.

Ch Abdul Haleem was chairman of the Municipal Committee from 1979 to 1984.

Specialty 
This city has long remained the house of a large number of people belonging to the Sikh religion prior to the Partition of India. At the time of partition, most of the Sikh families moved to Indian Punjab fearing for their lives and property. But their cultural sites in Farooqabad still remain a specialty of this city. Moreover, this city is famous for its Punjab Police (Pakistan) training center.

Moreover, the Pakistan Adventist Seminary and College (PASC) developed from a small Seventh-day Adventist Boys' School was founded in 1920 by the British. In 1937, it became a co-educational institution with the integration of the Seventh-day Adventist Girls' School.

Among the very few, this city also hosts one of the biggest Fountain House in Pakistan.

Census history

References

External links 
 Farooqabad on the WikiMapia

Populated places in Sheikhupura District